Women's coxless fours competition at the 1992 Summer Olympics in Barcelona was held between 27 July and 1 August at Lake of Banyoles. The event was an open-style, individual rowing event conducted as part of the Rowing at the 1992 Summer Olympics program.

Schedule

Results

Heats
First team of each heat qualify to the final, remainder goes to the repechage.

Heat 1

Heat 2

Repechage
Top two in each heat advanced to the final.

Heat 1

Heat 2

Finals

Final B

Final A

References

Rowing at the 1992 Summer Olympics
Women's rowing at the 1992 Summer Olympics
Women's events at the 1992 Summer Olympics